Solitude Standing is the second studio album by American singer-songwriter Suzanne Vega, released on April 1, 1987, by A&M Records. It is the most commercially successful and critically acclaimed album of Vega's, being certified Platinum in the US and reaching number 11 on the Billboard 200.

25th anniversary
In 2012, to mark the 25th anniversary of the album's release, Vega played four celebratory concerts in which the album was performed in its entirety. The first was in Copley Square, Boston on July 28; the second and third were at City Winery in Hudson Square, New York City on October 9 (7pm and 10pm shows); and the fourth at London's Barbican Theatre on October 16.

A limited-edition two-CD set, titled Solitude Standing: Live at the Barbican, was produced by Concert Live and made available for purchase instantly after the final show, as well as online.

Song notes
"Tom's Diner" was included twice on the album with its a cappella vocal as the first track and its instrumental version as the last track.
"Night Vision" was inspired by the poem "Juan Gris" by Paul Éluard.
"Calypso" is based on the Odyssey, namely the part in which Calypso is forced to let Odysseus go.
"Calypso" is mentioned in the work All the Young Dudes (fan fiction) by MsKingBean89 in which Odysseus and Calypso's relationship mirrors Remus and Grant's.
"Gypsy" is mentioned in the book The Perks of Being a Wallflower by Stephen Chbosky, in which the main character Charlie includes it on one of his mixtapes.
 Vega once stated she wrote "Gypsy" when she was only 18 years old (which would be 1977) which means the song was written 10 years before it was first released.
 Tom’s Diner was the song used to test prototype Mp3 compression software.

Track listing

Personnel
 Suzanne Vega – vocals, acoustic guitar
 Marc Shulman – electric guitars
 Anton Sanko – synthesizers, classical guitar on 5
 Michael Visceglia – bass guitar, additional synthesizer on 11
 Stephen Ferrera – drums, percussion

Additional personnel
 Shawn Colvin – backing vocals on 2
 Mitch Easter – rhythm guitar on 9
 Steve Addabbo – guitar on 9
 Frank Christian – electric guitar on 9
 Jon Gordon – guitar solo on 2
 Sue Evans – percussion on 7, drums on 9

Production
 Steve Addabbo – producer, engineer
 Lenny Kaye – producer
 Mitch Easter – producer on 9
 Ronald K. Fierstein – executive producer
 Rod O'Brien – engineer
 Shelly Yakus – mixing
 Jeffrey Gold – art direction
 Melanie Nissen – art direction, design
 Paula Bullwinkel – cover photography

Charts

Weekly charts

Year-end charts

Certifications and sales

!scope="row"|Worldwide
|
| 5,000,000
|-

References

Bibliography

 

1987 albums
A&M Records albums
Albums produced by Lenny Kaye
Albums produced by Steve Addabbo
Albums recorded at A&M Studios
Suzanne Vega albums